The 2000 United States Grand Prix (formally the 2000 SAP United States Grand Prix) was a Formula One motor race held on 24 September 2000 at Indianapolis Motor Speedway in Speedway, Indiana. It was the 15th round of the 2000 Formula One World Championship and the 34th United States Grand Prix. Ferrari driver Michael Schumacher won the 73-lap race from pole position. His teammate Rubens Barrichello finished second with Jordan driver Heinz-Harald Frentzen third.

McLaren driver David Coulthard started second, alongside Michael Schumacher. However, Coulthard was forced to serve a ten-second stop-go penalty on lap eight because he moved forward into the lead before the start. Michael Schumacher's main rival in the championship, Mika Häkkinen, started from fourth but retired with a blown engine on lap 26. Michael Schumacher thus had an unchallenged lead and was able to clinch his seventh win of the season, despite a spin in the final stages of the race.

As a consequence of the race, Michael Schumacher retook the lead in the Drivers' Championship by eight points over Häkkinen. Coulthard's fifth place in the Grand Prix eliminated any mathematical opportunity of him winning the Championship, and reduced his lead over fourth-placed Barrichello to eight points. In the Constructors' Championship, Ferrari took over the lead held by McLaren and established a ten-point advantage, with two races of the season remaining.

As of 2022 it was the last-ever podium finish for Mugen Honda engine to date.

Background
The 2000 United States Grand Prix was the fifteenth of the seventeen races in the 2000 Formula One World Championship and took place at the  clockwise Indianapolis Motor Speedway road course on 24 September 2000. The Grand Prix was contested by eleven teams, each of two drivers. The teams, also known as constructors, were McLaren, Ferrari, Jordan, Jaguar, Williams, Benetton, Prost, Sauber, Arrows, Minardi and BAR. Tyre supplier Bridgestone brought two different tyre compounds to the race; the Hard and the Extra Hard dry compound tyres.

The race marked the return to the Formula One calendar for the United States after being off the calendar since 1991. The race was removed from the calendar because of low attendance and its slot was given to the South African Grand Prix for the 1992 season. It was reinstated in December 1998 following a seven-year campaign pursued by the Indianapolis Motor Speedway owners Hulman and Co. To celebrate its return to the calendar, Jaguar drivers Eddie Irvine and Johnny Herbert drove a demonstration lap aboard a Jaguar R1 and a Taxicab around Broadway in New York City on the Tuesday afternoon before the race.

Going into the race, McLaren driver Mika Häkkinen led the Drivers' Championship with 80 points, ahead of Michael Schumacher on 78 points and David Coulthard on 61 points. Rubens Barrichello was fourth on 49 points with Ralf Schumacher fifth on 24 points. In the Constructors' Championship, McLaren were leading with 131 points ahead of their rivals Ferrari on 127 points. Williams were third with 34 points, while Benetton on 20 and Jordan with 17 points contended for fourth place. 

Ferrari, McLaren and Sauber opted to test at the Mugello Circuit. McLaren test driver Olivier Panis was fastest on the first day, ahead of Sauber's Pedro Diniz. Panis remained fastest on the second and final days. The Williams and Benetton teams chose to test at the Autódromo do Estoril circuit where Ralf Schumacher set the first day's fastest times. Jaguar and BAR performed their testing at the Silverstone Circuit where Jaguar's test driver Luciano Burti was fastest on the first day.

The circuit received a mixed response. Willams driver Jenson Button described the track as a "great circuit". However, BAR's Jacques Villeneuve was vocally critical of the track claiming that it would be "very difficult to get a good lap" and he also found the infield section "very slow". Mika Salo of Sauber stated that he disliked the first three hairpins although he was satisfied with the rest of the circuit.

Practice
There were four practice sessions preceding Sunday's race, two one-hour sessions on Friday and two 45-minute sessions on Saturday Friday's morning and afternoon practice sessions took place in warm and dry conditions. Michael Schumacher was fastest in the first practice session, with a time of 1 minute and 14.927 seconds; Barrichello had the second fastest time. Häkkinen set the third fastest time although his car's gearbox was changed. Button was fourth fastest, ahead of Villeneuve and Alexander Wurz. The two Jordan drivers were seventh and eighth (with Trulli ahead of Heinz-Harald Frentzen). Irvine and Nick Heidfeld rounded out the top ten fastest drivers. An electrical failure prevented Coulthard from participating as he was pushed onto the circuit by marshals and Giancarlo Fisichella removed his Benetton's left front wheel in a crash at turn 11. In the second practice session, Coulthard set the fastest lap time of the day, a 1:14.561, one tenth of a second quicker than teammate Häkkinen. Michael Schumacher and Barrichello slipped to third and fourth fastest respectively although both drivers stated that they were pleased with their pace. Frentzen and Trulli set the fifth and seventh fastest times respectively; they were separated by Ralf Schumacher. Button, Marc Gené and Villeneuve completed the top ten fastest drivers in the session. A crash by Herbert at turn 1 damaged his car's rear wheel and ended his session early.

The Saturday morning sessions were held on a wet track from overnight rain, resulting in low levels of grip and some drivers went off the track during the session. Häkkinen set the third session's fastest lap, a 1:15.802; Coulthard ended with the third fastest lap. Button was running quicker and set the second fastest time. Both Ferrari drivers were fourth and fifth–Barrichello quicker than Michael Schumacher. Fisichella, Frentzen, Ralf Schumacher, Verstappen and Diniz followed in the top ten. In the final practice session, Both Ferraris continued their good pace; Michael Schumacher was the quickest driver with a lap of 1:14.804. Barrichello had the second fastest time. The McLaren drivers remained quick—Coulthard in third and Häkkinen fifth—they were separated by Button. Frentzen was sixth quickest and found it difficult to adjust to the changeable conditions. Fisichella, Villeneuve, Ralf Schumacher and Trulli completed the top ten fastest drivers ahead of qualifying.

Qualifying

Saturday's afternoon one hour qualifying session saw each driver limited to twelve laps, with the starting order decided by their fastest laps. During this session, the 107% rule was in effect, which necessitated each driver set a time within 107 per cent of the quickest lap to qualify for the race. The session was held in cloudy weather with occasional rain showers. Michael Schumacher clinched his seventh pole position for the season, his first at the circuit, with a time of 1:14.266. He was joined on the front row of the grid by Coulthard, who was one-tenth of a second slower and was helped by running in the slipstream of teammate Häkkinen on the main straight. Häkkinen qualified third and stated that he was not unhappy with his starting position. Barrichello qualified fourth, three-tenths of a second behind Michael Schumacher, and said he had more grip in his car to improve his time. Trulli qualified fifth. Button took sixth after encountering a yellow flag for Jean Alesi's engine failure on his third run and admitted to pushing too hard at the first corner on his fourth attempt following encouragement by his team. Frentzen slid onto the grass during the session and managed to record the seventh quickest time. Villeneuve who secured eighth believed he could have set a faster time as he spun while on a quick lap. Diniz took ninth having removed some downforce which improved the feel of his car. Ralf Schumacher rounded out the top ten having suffered his spin on his fourth run. Wurz qualified eleventh and said that he was happy with his car. Ricardo Zonta qualified twelfth, blaming his car for his qualifying performance. He was ahead of Verstappen and Salo. Fisichella, who started 15th, stated that understeer and poor grip prevented him from setting a faster lap time. He managed to qualify ahead of Heidfeld and Irvine, who spun during the session. Arrows driver Pedro de la Rosa, Herbert and Alesi filled the next three positions; the latter had a lack of running due to a pneumatic valve system failure in his engine. The two Minardi drivers qualified at the rear of the grid; Gastón Mazzacane in front of Gené.

Qualifying classification

Warm-up

The drivers took to the track at 09:30 Eastern Standard Time (UTC-5) for a 30-minute warm-up session. It took place in wet conditions, where grip was poor and many drivers were forced onto the grass after sliding off the track. Both McLarens maintained their good performance from qualifying; Coulthard had the fastest time, a 1:23.14. Häkkinen was second in the other McLaren car. Michael Schumacher was third fastest and Villeneuve rounded out the top four, eight-tenths of a second behind Coulthard. After the warm-up session, but before the race, the Fédération Internationale de l'Automobile (FIA) safety delegate, Charlie Whiting, announced that he had moved the front row of the grid back eight meters after concerns were raised by Coulthard and Michael Schumacher who had experienced wheel spin when crossing the "Yard of Bricks". Whiting also confirmed that the pit lane speed limit zone would be advanced deeper into turn 13.

Race

The race started at 14:00 local time. Approximately 250,000 people attended the race, breaking the record attendance figure set at the 1995 Australian Grand Prix. Every driver except for Herbert started on the intermediate compound tyre. Coulthard, who started alongside Michael Schumacher, jumped the start and moved into the lead. Coulthard was later issued with a ten-second stop-go penalty. Going into the first corner, Häkkinen withstood Barrichello attempts to pass him for third place. Herbert made a poor start, dropping from 19th to 22nd at the end of the first lap. Frentzen lost seventh place mid-lap after running wide, losing two positions to Villeneuve and Ralf Schumacher. At the end of the first lap, Coulthard led from Michael Schumacher, Häkkinen, Barrichello, Trulli, Button, Villeneuve, Ralf Schumacher, Frentzen, Diniz, Zonta, Wurz, Irvine, Verstappen, Heidfeld, Salo, de la Rosa, Alesi, Fisichella, Gene, Mazzacane and Herbert. Coulthard had built a 1.7-second lead over Michael Schumacher by the start of lap two. On the back straight, Button attempted to overtake Trulli for fifth, but the two drivers collided. Both drivers made pit stops for repairs and emerged at the back of the field. Frentzen passed Ralf Schumacher for sixth position, while Zonta overtook Diniz for eighth and Verstappen moved up two positions to tenth after overtaking Irvine and Wurz.

Heidfeld was overtaken by de la Rosa for 13th on lap three, while Gené passed Fisichella for 17th position. On the next lap, Coulthard's lead to Michael Schumacher was reduced by one second. de la Rosa continued moving up the field by passing Wurz for twelfth. On the same lap, Alesi became the first driver to pit for dry tyres. Michael Schumacher began attacking Coulthard for the lead on lap five with the McLaren driver moving to defend his position. On lap six, Barrichello became the first of the frontrunners to pit, while Irvine lost eleventh position to de la Rosa. Häkkinen led several cars in the pit lane to change to dry tyres on lap seven, while Ralf Schumacher, Zonta, Verstappen, Irvine and Wurz. Coulthard took his penalty on lap eight and dropped from second to sixth. Fisichella made a pit stop to serve his identical penalty on the same lap, from twenty-second position and remained in that position. Michael Schumacher, Frentzen, Diniz and Mazzacane were the only drivers not to change tyres by lap 9, while Coulthard made a pit stop and rejoined in 16th.

Over the next three laps, de la Rosa and Zonta traded twelfth position, while Ralf Schumacher passed Barrichello for seventh. Diniz, who was running third, made a pit stop on lap twelve and emerged in sixth. Both Williams drivers began trading fastest laps on the same lap. During lap 13, Mazzacane began resisting Häkkinen's attempts to overtake him and Ralf Schumacher passed Diniz for fifth. Trulli became the first retirement of the race on the same lap after making a pit stop. Frentzen and Mazzacane made their pit stops on lap 14, allowing Häkkinen into second. Button retired on the start/finish straight a lap later due to an engine failure. Michael Schumacher made a pit stop on lap 16 and emerged sixteen seconds ahead of Häkkinen in the lead. Häkkinen began gradually reducing Michael Schumacher's lead. Salo spun off on lap 19 and became the race's third retirement. Seven laps later, Häkkinen had reduced Michael Schumacher's lead to four seconds before the McLaren driver suffered an engine failure. Herbert made a pit stop for a new nose cone on lap 27 and came out in 17th. Coulthard passed Irvine for ninth one lap later. Verstappen suffered from a brake failure on lap 35 and retired.

Coulthard continued to gain positions by passing de la Rosa for seventh on lap 37. Ralf Schumacher became the first driver to make a scheduled pit stop two laps later. On lap 40, Coulthard set the fastest lap of the race, a 1:14.710, while moved into fifth after overtaking Diniz and made his pit stop one lap later, rejoining in eleventh. On the next lap, Ralf Schumacher made another pit stop and remerged in 15th. de la Rosa retired with an gearbox failure on lap 46, while Fisichella went out one lap later with engine problems. Race leader Michael Schumacher made a pit stop on lap 49 and retained a ten-second lead over Frentzen. Mazzacane made a pit stop on the same lap and missed his stopping position striking one of his team's mechanics. Barrichello became the final driver to make a scheduled pit stop on lap 53. By the end of lap 55, with the scheduled pit stops completed, the order was Michael Schumacher, Barrichello, Frentzen, Villeneuve, Coulthard, Diniz, Zonta, Irvine, Alesi, Heidfeld, Wurz, Herbert, Gene, Ralf Schumacher and Mazzacane. Diniz made two more pit stops on laps 58 and 59 and dropped to tenth. 

At the start of lap 65, Villeneuve attempted to pass Frentzen for the third position heading into turn one but overshot the manoeuvre. Alesi became the race's final retirement when he retired with an engine failure on the same lap. Four laps later, Michael Schumacher spun off after putting a wheel onto the grass but retained the lead. Barrichello finished second 12.1 seconds behind, ahead of Frentzen in third, Villeneuve in fourth, Coulthard in fifth and Zonta rounding out the points scoring positions in sixth. Irvine in seventh was the last driver on the lead lap, with Diniz, Heidfeld, Wurz, Herbert, and Gené the last of the classified runners, albeit one lap behind.

Post-race

The top three drivers appeared on the podium to collect their trophies and in the subsequent press conference. Michael Schumacher explained that his late race spin was due to a lack of concentration after his team told him to reduce his pace. Nevertheless, he was happy with his victory and stated that his team would be concentrated on winning the Drivers' and Constructors' championships. Barrichello said that the wet-weather tyres allowed him to lap two seconds faster than on dry tyres. He also added that although his advantage lay on the wet track, he had struggled with excessive oversteer and maintaining his car on a heavy fuel load after taking his pitstop. During the post-race interview Frentzen described his race as "hard" due to the amount of time spent overtaking other drivers. He also praised his team for his result after a period of poor results.

Villeneuve expressed his disappointment at missing out on a third-place finish which would have been his team's first podium position: "Today was a lot of fun and we were really quick in the race, but it's frustrating to get so close to a podium. I made a couple of mistakes, but it probably wouldn't have made a difference in the end." Coulthard said that he felt disappointed over his jump-start for which he apologised. Zonta scored for the second consecutive race, having finished in sixth in the previous race in Italy. He said that he was pleased with the result, and that his rivals were quicker in the early stages of the race due to fuel loads but said that he managed to keep up with them.

After the race, Michael Schumacher accused Coulthard of "unsporting behaviour" in the battle for the race lead. The accusation arose from Coulthard's minor collision with the Ferrari driver. Michael Schumacher believed that Coulthard was driving dangerously: "He [Coulthard] ran in a way that he thought it [touching] could happen, and he didn't try to avoid that, that's pretty simple. As he is not fighting for the championship.....I just want to make sure that we don't see teammates helping the drivers fighting for the championship in the way which is not appropriate." Coulthard denied any wrongdoing: "I could have easily pushed him off the circuit. But I didn't and I won't in the future because it is not sporting and it is not the way I do things." There was similar ill-feeling between Trulli and Button after their collision on lap two. Trulli called the Williams driver an "idiot" and accused him of "driving like a crazy". Button defended his actions and suggested that Trulli had moved slightly towards him although he believed he took the right line. He also believed Trulli moved towards him under braking.

A total of 15 out of 20 Indianapolis 500 winners praised the inaugural running of the United States Grand Prix at the Indianapolis Motor Speedway. 1985 Indianapolis 500 winner Danny Sullivan heralded the race organisers for their efforts, "Tony George has done a phenomenal job of integrating it into (the schedule) and not losing the integrity of the current Indianapolis 500 track. I think this shows this is the place it (Formula One) should be." 1993 winner and double Formula One World Champion Emerson Fittipaldi believed that it would create a new era of Formula One motor racing in the United States. Fittipaldi's view was backed up by 1998 winner Eddie Cheever who thought the event would inspire more Americans to move into Formula One. The Grand Prix was awarded the Race Promoters' Trophy at the FIA Prize Giving Awards in Monte Carlo in December 2000.

As a consequence of the race, Michael Schumacher regained the lead in the Drivers' Championship, on 88 points, taking the Championship lead for the second time in the 2000 season. Häkkinen, who failed to score points, lost the lead in the Drivers' Championship, falling eight points behind Michael Schumacher. Coulthard, who finished fifth, remained third, twenty-five points behind Michael Schumacher which ruled out any chance of Coulthard claiming the Drivers' Championship. The poor results of the McLaren team, combined with the Ferraris clinching a one-two finish, meant that Ferrari retook the lead of the Constructors' Championship, ten points in front of McLaren.

Race classification
Drivers who scored championship points are denoted in bold.

Championship standings after the race 
Bold text indicates who still has a theoretical chance of becoming World Champion.

Drivers' Championship standings

Constructors' Championship standings

Note: Only the top five positions are included for both sets of standings.

References

United States Grand Prix
United States Grand Prix
United States Grand Prix, 2000
Grand Prix
2000 in sports in Indiana
Grand Prix